Rossmoor is a planned census-designated place located in Orange County, California. As of the 2020 census, the CDP had a total population of 10,625 up from the 2010 census population of 10,244. The gated Leisure World retirement community in the city of Seal Beach is to the south of Rossmoor, Los Alamitos is to the east and north, and Long Beach is to the west (on the other side of the San Gabriel River, the 605 freeway and the border with Los Angeles County). The community of Rossmoor has two shopping centers within its boundaries, but only one—the Rossmoor Village Square, is now within the political boundaries of Rossmoor. A larger shopping center, the Rossmoor Business Center, was annexed, despite many protests, by the City of Seal Beach in 1967. The Center has been remodeled several times and was renamed the Shops at Rossmoor in the early 2000s.

History
The Rossmoor community was developed from 1955 through 1961 by Ross W. Cortese, who had earlier developed the architecturally-significant Lakewood Rancho Estates in Long Beach (1953) and the Frematic Homes (1954) in Anaheim, just north and west of Disneyland. Cortese's original partners in securing the first large parcels of land that would become Rossmoor included California governor Goodwin Knight and Judge Alfred Gittelson, who had also partnered with him in the Lakewood Rancho Estates and the Frematic homes. (It was Gittelson who later agreed to annex his Rossmoor Shopping Center property to Seal Beach in the late 1960s.)  After Rossmoor, Cortese would construct the first of his very successful Leisure World gated retirement community in that part of Seal Beach which is immediately south of Rossmoor. The Rossmoor community is easy to recognize because of its red brick "signature wall" that borders the entire unincorporated community. It is a signature of the Rossmoor community that differentiates it from neighboring cities Los Alamitos and Seal Beach.

There are 3,430 single family homes, 1 apartment complex (Accent Apartment Homes, originally Rossmoor Manor on Wallingsford Road), and 1 town house complex (Rossmoor Town Houses with addresses at 12100 Montecito Road or 3342 Bradbury Road) within Rossmoor.

Rossmoor annexation debates

2020s

AB-1246 Community services districts. (2021-2022)
On February 19, 2021, Assembly Member Nguyen introduced AB-1246 Community services districts which would have made many "latent powers" available the Rossmoor Community Services District (RCSD). The bill died at the desk in February 2022 never being sent to committee.

2000s

History
According to a June 2006 consultant's report to the Rossmoor Planning Committee, the most cost effective solution for Rossmoor would be to be annexed by the city of Seal Beach.

Although it is not part of the city of Los Alamitos, it is served under the Los Alamitos "sphere of influence" and was proposed to be annexed to the city by 2007 after the Local Agency Formation Commission reviews the proposal.

Another proposal would combine Rossmoor with adjacent Seal Beach and Los Alamitos to form one city.

Rossmoor is served by the Rossmoor/Los Alamitos Area Sewer District. The mainly residential area is also served by the Rossmoor Community Services District (RCSD), which serves the community as an independent functionary does. The RCSD provides services related to public recreation facilities and park development for Rush Park, Rossmoor Park, two mini parks and the Montecito Center. The RCSD also administers street lighting, road rights-of-way services, and, subject to the consent of the County of Orange, the collection and disposal of garbage or refuse matter, and street sweeping. However, the RCSD cannot make decisions about the future of the community, which is all delegated to the County of Orange's Unincorporated Islands Program and the Orange County Board of Supervisors.

Current status
At the May 22, 2008 meeting, OC LAFCO recommended that the Rossmoor Incorporation Plan go to a vote of the community.
A vote by residents on the issue of incorporation was held on November 4, 2008.  The proposition for cityhood was resoundingly defeated by a vote of 72% to 28% indicating that the majority of residents desire not be incorporated as a city. Residents also voted down three separate utility tax proposals by a wide margin.

Climate
According to the Köppen Climate Classification system, Rossmoor has a semi-arid climate (abbreviated BSh) with Mediterranean characteristics.

Geography

Rossmoor is located at 33°47'20" North, 118°4'47" West (33.788917, -118.079721). It borders the cities of Los Alamitos and Seal Beach.

According to the United States Census Bureau, the CDP has a total area of 1.54 square miles (4.0 km), all of it land.

Demographics

2010
At the 2010 census Rossmoor had a population of 10,244. The racial makeup of Rossmoor was 8,691 (84.8%) White (76.6% Non-Hispanic White), 84 (0.8%) African American, 36 (0.4%) Native American, 838 (8.2%) Asian, 29 (0.3%) Pacific Islander, 168 (1.6%) from other races, and 398 (3.9%) from two or more races. Hispanic or Latino of any race were 1,174 persons (11.5%).

The whole population lived in households, no one lived in non-institutionalized group quarters and no one was institutionalized.

There were 3,631 households, 1,382 (38.1%) had children under the age of 18 living in them, 2,456 (67.6%) were opposite-sex married couples living together, 326 (9.0%) had a female householder with no husband present, 138 (3.8%) had a male householder with no wife present.  There were 90 (2.5%) unmarried opposite-sex partnerships, and 20 (0.6%) same-sex married couples or partnerships. 596 households (16.4%) were one person and 390 (10.7%) had someone living alone who was 65 or older. The average household size was 2.83.  There were 2,920 families (80.4% of households); the average family size was 3.17.

The age distribution was 2,550 people (24.9%) under the age of 18, 738 people (7.2%) aged 18 to 24, 1,742 people (17.0%) aged 25 to 44, 3,444 people (33.6%) aged 45 to 64, and 1,770 people (17.3%) who were 65 or older.  The median age was 45.5 years. For every 100 females, there were 92.4 males.  For every 100 females age 18 and over, there were 90.0 males.

There were 3,710 housing units at an average density of 2,412.3 per square mile, of the occupied units 3,180 (87.6%) were owner-occupied and 451 (12.4%) were rented. The homeowner vacancy rate was 0.4%; the rental vacancy rate was 3.6%.  8,998 people (87.8% of the population) lived in owner-occupied housing units and 1,246 people (12.2%) lived in rental housing units.

According to the 2010 United States Census, Rossmoor had a median household income of $208,807, with 3.3% of the population living below the federal poverty line.

2000
At the 2000 census there were 10,298 people in 3,763 households, including 2,975 families, in the CDP. The racial makeup of the CDP was 88.88% White, 0.78% African American, 0.34% Native American, 5.72% Asian, 0.10% Pacific Islander, 1.36% from other races, and 2.83% from two or more races.  6.7% of the population were Hispanic or Latino of any race.
Of the 3,763 households 37.4% had children under the age of 18 living with them, 68.9% were married couples living together, 8.2% had a female householder with no husband present, and 19.9% were non-families. 16.6% of households were one person and 10.6% were one person aged 65 or older.  The average household size was 2.77 and the average family size was 3.12.

The age distribution was 26.7% under the age of 18, 5.3% from 18 to 24, 23.4% from 25 to 44, 26.1% from 45 to 64, and 18.5% 65 or older.  The median age was 42 years. For every 100 females, there were 94.2 males.  For every 100 females age 18 and over, there were 89.6 males.

The median household income was $86,457 and the median family income was $93,500. Males had a median income of $71,875 versus $46,913 for females. The per capita income for the CDP was $38,642.  2.0% of the population and 1.3% of families were below the poverty line. 2.5% of those under the age of 18 and 1.3% of those 65 and older were living below the poverty line.

Politics
Rossmoor is in the 2nd Supervisorial District in Orange County, represented by Democrat Katrina Foley. Because Rossmoor is an unincorporated area within Orange County, the Supervisor is the key local elected official.

Education
The Los Alamitos Unified School District serves Rossmoor. Four of the six elementary schools of the district, Rossmoor, Weaver, Lee, and Hopkinson, are located within the boundaries of Rossmoor.

Notable residents
Frieda Rapoport Caplan, founder of Frieda's Inc., a specialty produce company in Los Alamitos. She created the specialty produce industry in the United States and revolutionized the fresh produce industry.
Landry Fields, former NBA basketball player for the New York Knicks and Toronto Raptors 
Johan Hultin, Swedish-American pathologist who helped sequence the 1918 influenza virus
Rocco Grimaldi, hockey player for the Nashville Predators
Malcolm Lucas, California Supreme Court Chief Justice (1987-1996)

References

External links
Rossmoor Community Services District
Rossmoor Homeowners Association
 LAFCO's Municipal Service Review Program - Los Alamitos / Seal Beach / Rossmoor / Sunset Beach MSR Focus Area

Census-designated places in Orange County, California
 
Populated places established in 1955
Census-designated places in California
1955 establishments in California